The 1995–96 Illinois Fighting Illini men's basketball team represented the University of Illinois.

Regular season
After advancing to the NCAA Tournament in 1994-95, Illinois extended its run on postseason play with a berth in the 1996 NIT. The Illini started the 1995-96 season 11-1 before losing Kiwane Garris to injury. Without its leader, the Illini dropped its first five Big Ten games. Garris returned, but was never 100 percent and junior forward Jerry Hester missed games with a severely sprained ankle. The Illini finished the 1996 season 18-13 overall, 7-11 in the Big Ten. But more importantly the 1996 season marked the end of the most successful era in Illinois basketball when Lou Henson announced his retirement before the end of the season. In his 21 years at Illinois, Henson notched 423 victories and guided the Illini to 11 NCAA Tournament appearances. The Okay, Oklahoma native coached Illinois to 11, 20-win seasons and finished his career as the third winningest coach in Big Ten history with 214 league victories.

Roster

Source

Schedule
												
Source																
												

|-
!colspan=12 style="background:#DF4E38; color:white;"| Non-Conference regular season

	

|-
!colspan=9 style="background:#DF4E38; color:#FFFFFF;"|Big Ten regular season

|-
!colspan=9 style="text-align: center; background:#DF4E38"|National Invitation Tournament

|-

Player stats

Awards and honors
Kiwane Garris
Team Most Valuable Player

Team players drafted into the NBA

Rankings

References

Illinois
Illinois Fighting Illini men's basketball seasons
Illinois
1995 in sports in Illinois
1996 in sports in Illinois